Seán Cronin (born 6 May 1986) is an Irish rugby union player who plays as a hooker for Leinster in the United Rugby Championship. He also played for the Ireland national rugby union team.

Youth
Cronin was educated at Ardscoil Rís in Limerick. He previously played with Shannon and Munster Rugby, where he had progressed through their academy to a development contract. Cronin's rugby career began to take off while playing in the All-Ireland League for Shannon.

Before becoming a professional rugby player, Cronin played minor Gaelic football with Limerick in 2004. He also won a Limerick Senior Football Championship medal with Monaleen in 2005.

Professional
Outings for Ireland A and two Celtic League appearances for his home province of Munster saw Cronin attract the attention of Connacht who offered him a full contract in the summer of 2008. In January 2011 it was announced that Cronin would join Leinster on a 2-year contract for the 2011–12 season, after 3 seasons at Connacht. Cronin retired at the end of the 2021–22 season.

Ireland
Cronin represented Ireland in rugby at Ireland Schools, U19, U21, and A (Ireland Wolfhounds) levels. Cronin earned his first cap against Fiji in November 2009. His second cap came as a replacement for Rory Best during the Ireland v Wales Six Nations game in March 2010. He won his first start against New Zealand in the 2010 summer tests and also started against Australia.

On 10 March 2018 Cronin scored a try in Ireland's 28–8 win over Scotland. The win clinched the 2018 Six Nations title for Ireland. While a mainstay of the Irish team for several years, Cronin started in only 10 of his 72 tests for Ireland. He made his first 6 Nations start in 2019 against Italy, his 32 previous 6 Nations appearances having come as a substitute.

References

External links

Leinster profile
Ireland profile
Pro14 profile

1986 births
Living people
People educated at Ardscoil Rís, Limerick
Alumni of Griffith College
Limerick inter-county Gaelic footballers
Monaleen Gaelic footballers
Rugby union players from County Limerick
Shannon RFC players
Munster Rugby players
Connacht Rugby players
Leinster Rugby players
Ireland international rugby union players
Rugby union hookers